Whisby is a hamlet in the civil parish of Doddington and Whisby, in the North Kesteven district of Lincolnshire, England.

The name 'Whisby' means 'farm/settlement of Hvit'.

Between Whisby and Thorpe on the Hill,  to the south, is Whisby Moor, which includes a nature park run by the Lincolnshire Wildlife Trust. Whisby also has a garden centre.

In 2011 the A46 road underwent reconstruction just outside Whisby. This included the building of a roundabout on the road which leads into the village.

The Nottingham to Lincoln railway line passes  to the south of the village on Station Road, at a level crossing next to the Railway Inn.

References

External links

 "Doddington and Whisby Parish Council", Lincolnshire.gov.uk. Retrieved 23 December 2011
 "Doddington", Genuki.org.uk. Retrieved 23 December 2011

Hamlets in Lincolnshire
North Kesteven District